Lhovice is a village and administrative part of Švihov in Klatovy District in the Plzeň Region of the Czech Republic. It has about 200 inhabitants.

History
The first written mention of Lhovice is from 1194. The village was also formerly called Mlhovice and Elhovice.

Gallery

References

Neighbourhoods in the Czech Republic
Populated places in Klatovy District